The 2015–16 season was Juventus Football Club's 118th in existence and ninth consecutive season in the top flight of Italian football in Serie A was their from promotion to Serie B in 2007 . Juventus added a third star to their jersey with new kit manufacturers Adidas in addition to the Coppa Italia badge for winning their tenth Coppa Italia the previous season. On 25 April 2016, the club won their fifth straight title (and 32nd overall) since last winning five straight between 1930–31 and 1934–35, after second place Napoli lost to Roma to give Juventus mathematical certainty of the title with three games to spare. After winning only three of their first ten league matches and losing to Sassuolo on 28 October 2015, which left them in 12th place, the team went on a run of 25 matches in which they took 73 points of a possible 75, and secured the title. On 21 May, the club then won the Coppa Italia for the 11th time, and their second straight title, becoming the first team in Italy's history to complete Serie A and Coppa Italia doubles in back-to-back seasons.

Season review
In the summer of 2015, several departures and arrivals occurred: Pirlo, Vidal, Tevez, Coman and Llorente leave the club, all towards foreign leagues. In order to counterbalance sales, the club proceeds to buy Alex Sandro, Khedira, Dybala, Zaza and Mandžukić. Juventus won the Supercoppa Italiana but the line-up revolution looks deleterious, as the Bianconeri start the domestic league with two losses to Udinese and Roma. In the following weeks, the club suffers draws to Chievo and Frosinone at Juventus Stadium, while Napoli and Sassuolo also defeat Allegri's team. In Europe, however, the second place of previous season is confirmed: Juventus suffers only one loss during the group stage, in the last match by Sevilla. Then the club went on a run in the league that resulted in a series of 15 wins in row, starting with Derby della Mole which ended 2–1 (with the final goal scored in injury time). In the first leg of the Coppa Italia semi-finals, Internazionale lost 3–0 in Turin.

The winning league streak is stopped on 19 February 2016, due to a goalless draw with Bologna. Four days later, Juventus face Bayern Munich (for the Champions League round of 16), the German side goes up 2–0, before Juventus manage to fill the gap for a final 2–2 draw. The Nerazzurri were able to recover from a 3–goal handicap: they lose only on penalties, due to Palacio's miss. In the second round of 16 leg in the Champions League, Pogba and Cuadrado bring Juventus up 2–0, but Lewandowski and Thomas Müller (who scores during injury time) equalize the score: in extra time, Thiago and ex-Juventus player Coman mark the goals to knock-out Juventus out 4–2. Four days after, Buffon celebrates a record for goalkeepers in Serie A, having a clean sheet of 974 minutes. On 25 April, Juventus, nine points over Napoli, mathematically won the Scudetto, after Napoli were defeated by Roma. Juventus ended the league with 91 points, also winning, a week later, the domestic cup (for the second time in row) with a 1–0 in extra time win against Milan.

Players

Squad information
Players and squad numbers last updated on 18 September 2015.Note: Flags indicate national team as has been defined under FIFA eligibility rules. Players may hold more than one non-FIFA nationality.

Transfers

Summer 2015

In

Out

Other acquisitions

Other disposals

Total expenditure: €125,700,000

Total revenue: €74,000,000

Net income:  €51,700,000

Winter 2015–16

In

Out

Other acquisitions

Other disposals

Total expenditure: €6,000,000

Total revenue: €0

Net income:  €6,000,000

Pre-season and friendlies

Competitions

Supercoppa Italiana

Serie A

League table

Results summary

Results by round

Matches

Coppa Italia

UEFA Champions League

Group stage

Knockout phase

Round of 16

Statistics

Appearances and goals

|-
! colspan=14 style="background:#DCDCDC; text-align:center"| Goalkeepers

|-
! colspan=14 style="background:#DCDCDC; text-align:center"| Defenders

|-
! colspan=14 style="background:#DCDCDC; text-align:center"| Midfielders

|-
! colspan=14 style="background:#DCDCDC; text-align:center"| Forwards

|-
! colspan=14 style="background:#DCDCDC; text-align:center"| Players transferred out during the season

Goalscorers

Last updated: 21 May 2016

Disciplinary record

Last updated: 21 May 2016

Notes

A.  The match was called after 70 minutes due to the annual tradition of pitch invasion.

References

Juventus F.C. seasons
Juventus
Juventus
Italian football championship-winning seasons